The Strega Prize is the most prestigious Italian literary award. It has been awarded annually since 1947 for the best work of prose fiction written in the Italian language by an author of any nationality and first published between 1 May of the previous year and 30 April.

History
In 1944 Maria and Goffredo Bellonci started to host a literary salon at their home in Rome. These Sunday gatherings of writers, artists and intellectuals grew to include many of the most notable figures of Italian cultural life. The group became known as the Amici della Domenica, or ‘Sunday Friends’. In 1947 the Belloncis, together with Guido Alberti, owner of the firm which produces the Strega liqueur, decided to inaugurate a prize for fiction, the winner being chosen by the Sunday friends.

The activities of the Bellonci circle and the institution of the prize were seen as marking a tentative return to ‘normality’ in Italian cultural life: a feature of the reconstruction which followed the years of Fascism, war, occupation and liberation.

The first winner of the Strega, elected by the Sunday Friends, was Ennio Flaiano, for his first and only novel Tempo di uccidere, which is set in Africa during the Second Italo-Abyssinian War. It has been translated into English as The Short Cut.

Maria Bellonci published a history of the Strega prize, titled Come un racconto gli anni del premio Strega, in 1971.

Selection process
Since the death of Maria Bellonci in 1986, the prize has been administered by the Fondazione Maria e Goffredo Bellonci. The members of the now 400-strong prize jury, drawn from Italy’s cultural elite, are still known as the Sunday Friends. For a book to be considered it must have the support of at least two Friends. This initial long list is whittled down at a first ballot to a short list of five. The second round of voting, followed by the proclamation of the victor, takes place on the first Thursday in July in the nymphaeum of the Villa Giulia, Rome.

Sponsorship
Telecom Italia have joined Liquore Strega as sponsors of the prize.

Premio Strega speciale, 2006
In 2006, the seventieth year of the Strega Prize, a special award was made to the Constitution of Italy, a document which was drawn up and approved during 1946, the year of the Strega’s birth. The award was received by former President of the Italian Republic Oscar Luigi Scalfaro.

Winners
1947 – Ennio Flaiano, Tempo di uccidere
1948 – Vincenzo Cardarelli, Villa Tarantola
1949 – Giambattista Angioletti, La memoria
1950 – Cesare Pavese, La bella estate
1951 – Corrado Alvaro, Quasi una vita
1952 – Alberto Moravia, I racconti
1953 – Massimo Bontempelli, L'amante fedele
1954 – Mario Soldati, Lettere da Capri
1955 – Giovanni Comisso, Un gatto attraversa la strada
1956 – Giorgio Bassani, Cinque storie ferraresi
1957 – Elsa Morante, L'isola di Arturo
1958 – Dino Buzzati, Sessanta racconti
1959 – Giuseppe Tomasi di Lampedusa, Il gattopardo
1960 – Carlo Cassola, La ragazza di Bube
1961 – Raffaele La Capria, Ferito a morte
1962 – Mario Tobino, Il clandestino
1963 – Natalia Ginzburg, Lessico famigliare
1964 – Giovanni Arpino, L'ombra delle colline
1965 – Paolo Volponi, La macchina mondiale
1966 – Michele Prisco, Una spirale di nebbia
1967 – Anna Maria Ortese, Poveri e semplici
1968 – Alberto Bevilacqua, L'occhio del gatto
1969 – Lalla Romano, Le parole tra noi leggere
1970 – Guido Piovene, Le stelle fredde
1971 – Raffaello Brignetti, La spiaggia d'oro
1972 – Giuseppe Dessì, Paese d'ombre
1973 – Manlio Cancogni, Allegri, gioventù
1974 – Guglielmo Petroni, La morte del fiume
1975 – Tommaso Landolfi, A caso
1976 – Fausta Cialente, Le quattro ragazze Wieselberger
1977 – Fulvio Tomizza, La miglior vita
1978 – Ferdinando Camon, Un altare per la madre
1979 – Primo Levi, La chiave a stella
1980 – Vittorio Gorresio, La vita ingenua
1981 – Umberto Eco, Il nome della rosa
1982 – Goffredo Parise, Il sillabario n.2
1983 – Mario Pomilio, Il Natale del 1833
1984 – Pietro Citati, Tolstoj
1985 – Carlo Sgorlon, L'armata dei fiumi perduti
1986 – Maria Bellonci, Rinascimento privato
1987 – Stanislao Nievo, Le isole del paradiso
1988 – Gesualdo Bufalino, Le menzogne della notte 
1989 – Giuseppe Pontiggia, La grande sera 
1990 – Sebastiano Vassalli, La chimera
1991 – Paolo Volponi, La strada per Roma
1992 – Vincenzo Consolo, Nottetempo, casa per casa1993 – Domenico Rea, Ninfa plebea1994 – Giorgio Montefoschi, La casa del padre1995 – Mariateresa Di Lascia, Passaggio in ombra1996 – Alessandro Barbero, Bella vita e guerre altrui di Mr. Pyle, 'gentiluomo'1997 – Claudio Magris, Microcosmi 1998 – Enzo Siciliano, I bei momenti 1999 – Dacia Maraini, Buio 2000 – Ernesto Ferrero, N. 2001 – Domenico Starnone, Via Gemito 2002 – Margaret Mazzantini, Non ti muovere 2003 – Melania Mazzucco, Vita2004 – Ugo Riccarelli, Il dolore perfetto 2005 – Maurizio Maggiani, Il viaggiatore notturno 2006 – Sandro Veronesi, Caos calmo2007 – Niccolò Ammaniti, Come Dio comanda2008 – Paolo Giordano, La solitudine dei numeri primi2009 – Tiziano Scarpa, Stabat mater2010 – Antonio Pennacchi, Canale Mussolini2011 – Edoardo Nesi, Storia della mia gente2012 – Alessandro Piperno, Inseparabili2013 – Walter Siti, Resistere non serve a niente2014 – Francesco Piccolo, Il desiderio di essere come tutti2015 – Nicola Lagioia, La Ferocia2016 – Edoardo Albinati, La scuola cattolica2017 – Paolo Cognetti, Le otto montagne2018 – Helena Janeczek, La ragazza con la Leica 
2019 – Antonio Scurati, M. Il figlio del secolo2020 – Sandro Veronesi, Il colibrì2021 – Emanuele Trevi, Due vite2022 – Mario Desiati, Spatriati''

References

External links
Sito ufficiale del Premio Strega 
Italian Literary Prize Celebrates 50th Anniversary, Library of Congress
The Strega Prize, from the Strega Alberti company
, (The official short biographies of the 11 finalists in the 2006 edition).

 

 
Awards established in 1947
Italian literary awards
Strega
1947 establishments in Italy